Wood Newton (born September 16, 1946 in Hampton, Arkansas, United States) is an American songwriter and musician based in Nashville, Tennessee. Newton was born in Hampton, Arkansas, and graduated from Hampton High School in Hampton, Arkansas in 1964. He graduated from the University of Arkansas in 1970.

In 1978 and 1979, Newton recorded for Elektra Records, charting the singles "Last Exit for Love", "Lock, Stock & Barrel" and "Julie (Do I Ever Cross Your Mind?)". He later became a songwriter for other artists, with his credits including Razzy Bailey's number one single "Midnight Hauler".

Live performances
Newton performs on a regular basis with solo guitar, and vocals.

Discography

Albums

Singles

Chart singles

The following is a list of Wood Newton compositions that were chart hits.

Songs written by Wood Newton
Razzy Bailey – "Midnight Hauler", "Blind Faith and the Naked Truth", "Twenty Years Ago"
The Oak Ridge Boys – "Bobbie Sue"
Restless Heart – "I Want Everyone to Cry"
Steve Wariner – "What I Didn't Do", "Do You Want To Make Something of It", "I Can See Arkansas", "The Heartland"
Kenny Rogers – "Twenty Years Ago", "I'll Be There For You"
Pearl River – "Fool to Fall"
David Ball – "Riding with Private Malone", "Happy with the One I've Got", "I Can See Arkansas", "Loser Friendly", "She Always Talked About Mexico", "Swing Baby", "Too Much Blood in My Alcohol Level", "Violence and Lies"
Tracy Byrd "Pink Flamingos"
Conway Twitty "Every Time I Think It's Over"
T. G. Sheppard "A Little Less Blue"
Alabama "All Together Now"
Charley Pride "Just for the Love of It", "Lonestar Lonely"
B. J. Thomas "I Want Everyone to Cry", "The Girl Most Likely To"
Martin Delray "Lillie's White Lies", "One in a Row"
Bjøro Håland "Blue Rendezvous", "If I Could Make A Living Loving You", "Making Future Memories", "She's Not Leaving, She's Gone", "The Door", "The Name of the Game is Cheating", "What I Didn't Do"

References

1946 births
American country singer-songwriters
People from Hampton, Arkansas
People from Nashville, Tennessee
Singer-songwriters from New York (state)
Singer-songwriters from New Jersey
Singer-songwriters from Tennessee
Elektra Records artists
Living people
Singer-songwriters from Arkansas
Country musicians from New York (state)
Country musicians from Tennessee
Country musicians from Arkansas
Country musicians from New Jersey